The Saur Mountains (Sauyr jotalary) is one of the mountain ranges in the Tian Shan system. An eastern extension of the Tarbagatai Mountains, it starts on the China-Kazakhstan border and continues east into China, where it forms the border between the Hoboksar Mongol Autonomous County and Jeminay County of Xinjiang.

The highest peak of the range, and of the entire Saur-Tarbagatai mountain system, is the ice-capped Sauyr Zhotasy, also known as the Muz Tau.

Streams flowing south from the Saur make irrigated agriculture possible, although on a very limited scale, in their valleys in Hoboksar County. Apparently it is streams like this that Chinese geographers describe as "seasonal rivers sourcing from the northern mountains" whose water occasionally reaches the Manas Lake.

Notes

Mountain ranges of Xinjiang
Mountain ranges of Kazakhstan